Tobacco smoking among South Africans in recent years, has decreased largely due to the increase in the precaution of the dangers of smoking and enforcement of stricter legislation on the tobacco industry. In 1996, the provinces with the highest percentage and prevalence of smoking include Northern Cape (55%), Western Cape (48%) and North-West (46%). However, the number of smokers still remains stagnant. Despite the efforts to bring awareness to the risks that come with smoking, there is still a high prevalence of tobacco use in South Africa; and it is a major contributor to morbidity and mortality.

Statistics 
As more significant studies are published on smoking and second handing inhalation of smoke, the South African public has become more educated on the dangers of smoking. This has led to the overall decline in number of smokers and thus number of related deaths. Currently, approximately 50,000 South Africans die per year due to the effects smoking such as an increased risk for lung cancer and cardiovascular disease. In 2000 approximately 34,108 males and 10,306 females died due to the various consequences of smoking. According to the latest South African National Health and Nutrition Examination Survey in 2012 only about 16.4% of South Africans smoked which is a substantial drop from 32% in 1993. This decrease is attributed to legislation which led to restrictions in advertisement, and an increase tobacco prices. However, a Youth Risk Behavior Survey found that 21% of students in grades 8-11 smoke. This shows little to no change between 2002 and 2008.

Legislation

The Tobacco Products Control Act (1993) 

In order to combat the dangers of smoking, legislation has been increasingly put into place in order to deter the public from smoking. Beginning in 1993 with the Tobacco Products Control Act, South African began to pass legislation to in order to protect the public. It was fully implemented and enforced in 1995, meaning smoking in public places became some-what regulated. In addition, the act prohibited some aspects of advertisement, the promotion of tobacco products, and the publicity of a sponsorship is prohibited. Merchandise containing tobacco may be visible when being sold, however customers are not allowed to handle the products prior to the purchase. Labeling was limited in some aspects, however was not heavily regulated until 1999. Notably the act prohibited the sale of tobacco products to minor under the age of 16.

Tobacco Products Control Amendment Act (1999) 
The Tobacco Products Control Act of 1993 was considered to be incomplete and incomprehension, and in 1999 the South African government passed the Tobacco Products Control Amendment Act. This created stricter regulations for public smoking and banned smoking in public places such as restaurants, the work place and public transport. Being set into motion in 2001 the act prohibited all forms of tobacco advertising and promotion. Additionally, the act suggests penalties for those who transgress the law. The act also places a limit on the permissible levels of nicotine and tar.

References